Weston Lullingfields is a village in Shropshire, England.  It is located about 15 km north west of Shrewsbury. The population as taken at the 2011 census can be found under Baschurch.

Etymology
The village name 'Weston' is a common one in England.  It is Anglo Saxon in origin and means 'west farm'.

Canal
Weston Lullingfields was a terminus of a branch of the Ellesmere Canal known as the Weston Branch. The canal was originally intended to continue on to Shrewsbury, but was never completed as intended. At Weston Lullingfields the canal company built a wharf, four lime kilns, a public house, stables, a clerk's house and weighing machine. These were opened in 1797 and closed in 1917 when the Weston branch was closed following a breach of the canal.

See also
Listed buildings in Baschurch

References

External links

Villages in Shropshire
Ellesmere Canal
Lime kilns in the United Kingdom